Bishop Yosafat Oleh Hovera (born 12 September 1967 in Ivano-Frankivsk, Ukrainian SSR) is a Ukrainian Greek Catholic hierarch as an Archiepiscopal Exarch of Ukrainian Catholic Archiepiscopal Exarchate of Lutsk and Titular Bishop of Caesariana since 15 January 2008.

Life
Bishop Hovera was born in the family of clandestine Greek-Catholics in Ivano-Frankivsk, where he grew up. After graduation from school he joined a clandestine theological seminary.

He was ordained as priest for the Ukrainian Catholic Archeparchy of Lviv on 30 May 1990, after completing clandestine theological studies, and was appointed as a parish priest in Velyka Berezovytsia. Fr. Hovera continued his studies in the Catholic University of Lublin from 1996 until 1999. After returning in the Ukraine he was appointed as a vice-rector of the Major Theological Seminary in Ternopil (1999–2004). During 2004–2007 he again continued his studies, but this time in Rome, in the Pontifical Oriental Institute with a licentiate degree in pastoral theology. In 2007 he was appointed as a Rector of the Theological Seminary in Ternopil.

On 15 January 2008 Fr. Hovera was appointed, and on 7 April 2008 was consecrated to the Episcopate as the Titular Bishop of Caesariana. The principal consecrator was Cardinal Lubomyr Husar, the Head of the Ukrainian Greek Catholic Church.

Personal details
His father, Yaroslav Hovera, was a prisoner in the Soviet Union Gulag and spent 15 years in the corrective labor camp in Karaganda.

Bishop Hovera has a two brothers, who also are a clergymen: Rev. Andriy Ivan Hovera (born 1966), Synkellos of the Ukrainian Catholic Archeparchy of Ternopil–Zboriv, and Rev. Vasyl Hovera (born 1972), Apostolic Administrator for Apostolic Administration of Kazakhstan and Central Asia.

References

1967 births
Living people
Religious leaders from Ivano-Frankivsk
John Paul II Catholic University of Lublin alumni
Pontifical Oriental Institute alumni
Academic staff of the Pontifical Oriental Institute
Ukrainian Eastern Catholics
Bishops of the Ukrainian Greek Catholic Church